Upland Stories is an album by American country musician Robbie Fulks, released on April 1, 2016 on Bloodshot Records. It was produced by Steve Albini. Upland Stories was nominated for a Grammy for Best Folk Album and the song "Alabama at Night" was nominated for a Grammy for Best American Roots Song.

Critical reception

Upland Stories received generally favorable reviews from critics; on Metacritic, it has a score of 87 out of 100, indicating "universal acclaim". One such review was written by Bob Paxman for Nash Country Weekly. In his review, Paxman wrote that Fulks had "reached his highest plateau" with Upland Stories, and concluded by calling it "a masterful album, replete with wonderful stories and fully drawn characters."

Track listing

Personnel
Steve Albini – engineering, mixing
Shad Cobb – banjo, fiddle, vocals
Jim DeMain – mastering
Robbie Fulks – banjo, guitar, production, vocals
Robbie Gjersoe – baritone guitar, electric guitar, resonator guitar, ukulele, viola
Andy Goodwin – cover photograph, photography
Markus Greiner – layout
Alex Hall – drums
Jim Herrington – photography
Wayne Horvitz – organ, Wurlitzer
Fats Kaplin – mandolin, pedal steel
Todd Phillips – bass
Jenny Scheinman – fiddle, vocals
Grégoire Yeche – assistant

References

Robbie Fulks albums
2016 albums
Bloodshot Records albums
Albums produced by Steve Albini